Sphere3 (pronounced Sphere Cubed) are an English progressive rock / jazz fusion band.

Background
Originally formed in the 1990s, the band has been constantly evolving ever since.  Starting out as a five-piece progressive rock band with vocals, they later became a fully instrumental ensemble playing many musical genres.

Sphere3 have played extensively around the UK and Europe. In concert, they have gained a strong reputation for their live performances, and have played with several progressive rock acts such as The Flower Kings, Magnum, Focus, and IQ.

Line-up 
The band's current line-up features Steve Anderson on guitars (also with Grey Lady Down and The Room), William Burnett on bass (previously also with Psychoyogi), Neil Durant on keyboards (also with IQ), and Jamie Fisher on drums/percussion (also with ReGenesis, Santo El Diablo, and collaborations with Carrie Melbourne, Katie Melua’s producer Steve Sale, Samantha Fox, Charlie Bicknell, Celloman, Larp, The Guvnors, The Incredibly Strange Film Band, and opera singer Melinda Hughes).

Discography
 Demo (1992); cassette
 Signatures (1994); cassette EP
 "Three Simple Words", track on Cyclops Sampler 2 (1995); CD compilation
 "Again", track on The Third Cyclops Sampler (1996); CD compilation
 "Shrimp.SNG", track on Cyclops Sampler 4 (2000); CD compilation
 Paralysis (2001); 3-track CD EP
 Comeuppance (2002); CD album
 "An Unusual January (Monkyfrog Mix)", track on Cyclops Sampler 5 (2002); CD compilation

References

External links
 Official band website
 MySpace page
 Cyclops Records

English progressive rock groups
Jazz fusion ensembles